December 30 - Eastern Orthodox liturgical calendar - January 1

All fixed commemorations below are observed on January 13 by Eastern Orthodox Churches on the Old Calendar.

For December 31st, Orthodox Churches on the Old Calendar commemorate the Saints listed on December 18.

Feasts
 Apodosis of the Nativity of Christ.

Saints
 Holy Ten Virgin-martyrs of Nicomedia (c. 286 - 305) 
 Martyr Olympiodora, by fire. 
 Martyr Busiris, martyred by women with knitting needles. 
 Martyr Nemi (Nemo), by the sword. 
 Saint Gaudentius. 
 Hieromartyr Zoticus the Priest, of Constantinople, Guardian of Orphans (c. 340)  (see also December 30)
 Saint Anysius, Bishop of Thessaloniki (c. 407)  (see also December 30)
 Venerable Melania the Younger, Nun of Rome (439)
 Venerable Gelasius, Monk (Abba), of Palestine. 
 Venerable Gaius. 
 Saint George the Wonderworker, "the stabbed".
 Venerable Sabiana, Abbess of Samtskhe (11th century)

Pre-Schism Western saints
 Saint Columba of Sens (273)
 Martyrs of Catania: 
 Stephen, Pontian, Attalus, Fabian, Cornelius, Sextus, Flos, Quintian, Minervinus and Simplician, early martyrs in Catania in Sicily.
 Martyrs Donata, Paulina, Rustica, Nominanda, Serotina, Hilaria and Companions.
 Hieromartyrs Sabinian and Potentian (c. 303)
 Saint Silvester I, Pope of Rome (335)
 Saint Barbatian, Priest and Confessor, at Ravenna (5th century)
 Saint Peter of Subiaco (1003)

Post-Schism Orthodox saints
 Blessed Theophylactus of Ohrid, Archbishop of Ochrid (c. 1126)
 Saint Peter (Mogila), Metropolitan of Kiev, Defender of the Orthodox faithful against subjugation to the Roman Papacy ('Unia') (1646)  (see also: December 15 - Glorification)
 Venerable Cyriacus of Bisericani monastery, Romania (1660)
 Venerable Cyriacus of Tazlu, Romania (1660)

New martyrs and confessors
 New Hieromartyr Michael Berezin, Priest (1937)
 Martyr Peter Troitsky (1938)
 New Hiero-Confessor Dositheus (Vasich), Metropolitan of Zagreb (1945)

Icon gallery

Notes

References

Sources
 December 31/January 13. Orthodox Calendar (PRAVOSLAVIE.RU).
 January 13 / December 31. HOLY TRINITY RUSSIAN ORTHODOX CHURCH (A parish of the Patriarchate of Moscow).
 December 31. OCA - The Lives of the Saints.
 The Autonomous Orthodox Metropolia of Western Europe and the Americas (ROCOR). St. Hilarion Calendar of Saints for the year of our Lord 2004. St. Hilarion Press (Austin, TX). p. 4.
 December 31. Latin Saints of the Orthodox Patriarchate of Rome.
 The Roman Martyrology. Transl. by the Archbishop of Baltimore. Last Edition, According to the Copy Printed at Rome in 1914. Revised Edition, with the Imprimatur of His Eminence Cardinal Gibbons. Baltimore: John Murphy Company, 1916. pp. 402–403.

 Greek Sources
 Great Synaxaristes:  31 ΔΕΚΕΜΒΡΙΟΥ. ΜΕΓΑΣ ΣΥΝΑΞΑΡΙΣΤΗΣ.
  Συναξαριστής. 31 Δεκεμβρίου. ECCLESIA.GR. (H ΕΚΚΛΗΣΙΑ ΤΗΣ ΕΛΛΑΔΟΣ).

 Russian Sources
  13 января (31 декабря). Православная Энциклопедия под редакцией Патриарха Московского и всея Руси Кирилла (электронная версия). (Orthodox Encyclopedia - Pravenc.ru).
  31 декабря (ст.ст.) 13 января 2013 (нов. ст.). Русская Православная Церковь Отдел внешних церковных связей. (DECR).

December in the Eastern Orthodox calendar